Rafi Kirder is the bassist and vocalist for the Swiss band Deathrope under his alter persona Richland K. Harper.

Career 
Kirder is best known for having been the bassist for the Swiss Pagan metal band Eluveitie, which he left on 4 June 2008.

Family 
Rafi Kirder played a long time in Eluveitie and Red Shamrock with his twin brother Sevan and is of Armenian descent.

Discography

With Eluveitie 
Vên (2003) – EPSpirit (2006) – CDSlania (2008) – CDLive at Metalcamp – (2008) – CDSlania / Evocation I – The Arcane Metal Hammer Edition – (2009) – CDThe Early Years – (2012) – CDSlania - 10 Years (2018) – CD

 With Red Shamrock Mosaic / Mirror (2003) – EP…as hot as irish (2004) – CDfrom the ashes (2006) – CDdesert snow (2008) – CDdeman's playground (2012) – CD

 With Deathrope Bloody Tales (2009) – EPHang 'em High (2010) – CDGO! (2014) – CDLove Hz (2017) – CDRams & Roaches (2020) – CD

 With Inish jewels of the ocean (2006) – CDthe calm before the storm (2008) – CDwelcome home'' (2018) – CD

References

External links 

Official Eluveitie website
Official Red Shamrock website
 Rafi Kirder's Myspace Site
Rafi Kirder's DeviantArt Site

1980 births
Heavy metal bass guitarists
Living people
Rock double-bassists
Swiss people of Armenian descent
Swiss rock musicians
Swiss bass guitarists
Male bass guitarists
21st-century double-bassists
21st-century bass guitarists
21st-century male musicians